Sindhi folklore Sindhi Folklore is the folk tradition which has developed in Sindh over a number of centuries. Sindh abounds with folklore, in all forms, and colors from such obvious 

manifestations as the traditional Watayo Faqir tales, the legend of Moriro, epic poetry tale of Dodo Chanesar, to the heroic character of Marui which distinguishes it among the contemporary folklores of the region. The love story of Sassui, who pines for her lover Punhu, is known and sung in every Sindhi settlement.  Other examples of the folklore of Sindh include the stories of Umar Marui and Suhuni Mehar (Sohni Mahiwal in Punjab region). 
 
Sindhi folk Singers and women play a vital role to transmit the Sindhi folklore. They sang the folktales of Sindh in songs with passion in every village of Sindh.

Sindhi folklore has been compiled in a series of forty volumes under Sindhi Adabi Board's project of Folklore and Literature. This valuable project was accomplished by noted Sindhi scholar Dr.Nabi Bux Baloch. The material for the project has been collected both from the oral traditions village folks and the written record. This folklore series deals with diverse segments Sindhi folklore and literature, e.g., fables and fairy tales, pseudo-historical romances, folk-poetry, folk songs, proverbs, and riddles. These thirty volumes include:

Sarmad Sindhi
 Madahun ain Manajatun (مداحون ۽ مناجاتون)
Munaqiba (مناقبا)
 Mu'jiza (معجزه)
 Maulud (مولود)
 Tiha akhariyun or Siharfi (ٽيه اکريون)
 Beit     ( بيت)
 Waqi ati baita (واقعاتي بيت)
 Nar ja baita (نڙ جا بيت)
 Lok Git (لوڪ گيت)
 Loke Kahaniyun (لوڪ ڪهاڻيون)
 Ishqia dastan (عشقيه داستان)
 Moriro ain Mangar Machh  (مورڙو ۽ مانگر مڇ)
 Lilan Chanesar (ليلان چنيسر)
 Umar Marui (عمر مارئي)
 Momal Rano (مومل راڻو)
 Noori Jam Tamachi (نوري ڄام تماچي)
 Sassui Punhun (سسئي پنهون)
 Rites and rituals, ceremonies and superstitions (رسمون رواج۽ سوڻ ساٺ)
 Dodo Chanesar (دودو چنيسر)
 Jung Namo (جنگنامو)
 Sindhi Riddles (ڳجهارتون)
 Geecha (ڳيچ)
 Sohni Mehar  (سهڻي ميهار)
 Doar (ڏور)

See also
Balochi folklore
Saraiki folklore
Punjabi folklore
Pakistani folklore

References

External links
 Sindhi Adabi Board

 
Culture of Sindh
Sindhi language